Demax Medical Technology Co,.Ltd. is a joint venture between Chinese and Australian investors, based in Beijing, China, and primarily involved in designing and manufacturing disposable medical devices used in Interventional cardiology, radiology, and other fields.  It has three divisions: Medical devices manufacturing, Finlumen Tubing Extrusion, and Perfit Mould.

History 

Demax Medical Technology Co., Ltd. （Beijing), founded in November 2004, is a corporation engaged in the design, manufacturing, and sale of single-use sterile medical devices.

It started with 14 million gross investments and 10 million registered capital. Within the total 1200 m2 company area, the manufacturing area is 300 m2 class 100K clean room which has 300K pcs manufacturing capacity. Within the total 4808m2 company area, the class 100K clean room covers more than 750 m2, and the 10K class clean room covers over 400m2. Annual output was predicted at 800K pcs of products.

The main products are PTCA accessories, including control syringes, manifolds, Y connector pack, introducer sheath pressure lines, etc., which are used for angiography, balloon dilation, and stent implantation during PTCA operations.

Subsidiaries

Medical Devices Manufacturing 

The main products are PTCA accessories, including balloon in-deflation device, control syringes, manifolds, Y connector pack, pressure lines, and 3 way stopcock.

Finlumen Tubing Extrusion

Finlumen, Inc. is the leading precision extrusion manufacturer in Asia. Diversified application covers Medical Device, Micro Catheter, Laboratory Equipment, Aerospace, and Micro-Electronics.

Perfit Mould

Perfit Mould designs and manufactures plastic and metal precision moulds, especially for Medical Devices, Consumer Electronics, and Telecommunication.

References

External links

 Demax Medical, Inc., website

Manufacturing companies based in Beijing
Medical technology companies of China